Roselawn is a neighborhood in Cincinnati, Ohio, United States. The population was 7,039 at the 2020 census.

Roselawn was annexed to the city of Cincinnati in 1905.

References

Neighborhoods in Cincinnati